Dotta may refer to:

 Dotta (butterfly), a genus of butterflies in the tribe Astictopterini
 Giulia Dotta, an Italian dancer and choreographer